Oligotricha is a genus of giant casemakers in the family Phryganeidae. There are about eight described species in Oligotricha.

Species
 Oligotricha evanescens (Scudder, 1890)
 Oligotricha fulvipes (Matsumura, 1904)
 Oligotricha hybridoides Wiggins & Kuwayama, 1971
 Oligotricha kawamurai (Iwata, 1927)
 Oligotricha lapponica (Hagen, 1864)
 Oligotricha maxima (Iwata, 1927)
 Oligotricha spicata Wiggins & Kuwayama, 1957
 Oligotricha striata (Linnaeus, 1758)

References

Further reading

 
 
 
 

Trichoptera genera